Desperate Rescue: The Cathy Mahone Story is a 1993 American made-for-television drama film starring Mariel Hemingway. It was directed by Richard A. Colla and originally premiered on NBC on January 18, 1993.

Plot
Film based on a true story of a woman who tries to rescue her 7-year-old daughter from the Middle East after she is abducted by her Jordanian father.

Cast
 Mariel Hemingway as Cathy Mahone
 Clancy Brown as Dave Chattelier
 Jeff Kober as J.D. Roberts
 James Russo as Don Feeney
 Lindsey Haun as Lauren Mahone
 Andrew Masset as Ali

Reception
The Movie Scene stated: "What this all boils down to is that "Desperate Rescue: The Cathy Mahone Story" is entertaining in a typical made for TV way but it is a story which to me probably has the greatest power for those close to the people involved and like some true story movies it doesn't translate well for those who stumble across it who don't know the ins and outs of the true story".

References

External links
 
 Desperate Rescue at Moviefone
 Desperate Rescue at The Movie Scene

1993 television films
1993 films
1993 drama films
1990s English-language films
Drama films based on actual events
Films about child abduction in the United States
Films set in Jordan
NBC network original films
Films directed by Richard A. Colla
American drama television films
1990s American films